Alkekengi officinarum, the bladder cherry, Chinese lantern, Japanese-lantern, strawberry groundcherry, or winter cherry, is a species of flowering plant in the nightshade family Solanaceae. It is a close relative of the new world Calliphysalis carpenteri (Carpenter's groundcherry) and a somewhat more distant relative to the members of the Physalis genus. This species is native to the regions covering Southern Europe to South Asia and Northeast Asia.

Description
It is easily identifiable by the large, bright orange to red papery covering over its fruit, which resembles paper lanterns. It is a perennial herbaceous plant growing to 40–60 cm tall, with spirally arranged leaves 6–12 cm long and 4–9 cm broad. The flowers are white, with a five-lobed corolla 10–15 mm across, with an inflated basal calyx which matures into the papery orange fruit covering, 4–5 cm long and broad. And it has one variety, Alkekengi officinarum var. franchetii.

Research has shown Calliphysalis carpenteri (formerly classified as Physalis carpenteri) to be among the most closely related species to Physalis alkekengi.

Cultivation

It is a popular ornamental plant, widely cultivated in temperate regions of the world, and very hardy to below . It can be invasive with its wide-spreading root system sending up new shoots some distance from where it was originally planted. In various places around the world, it has escaped from cultivation.

In the United Kingdom it has been given the Royal Horticultural Society's Award of Garden Merit.

Traditional uses
The dried fruit is called the golden flower in the Unani system of medicine, and used as a diuretic, antiseptic, liver corrective, and sedative.

In Chinese medicine, Alkekengi is used to treat such conditions as abscesses, coughs, fevers, and sore throat. The extinct Dacian language has left few traces, but in De Materia Medica by Pedanius Dioscorides, a plant called Strychnos alikakabos (Στρύχνος άλικακάβος) is discussed, which was called kykolis (or cycolis) by the Dacians. Some have considered this plant to be Alkekengi officinarum, but the name more likely refers to ashwagandha (Withania somnifera).

Chemical constituents
Alkekengi officinarum contains a wide variety of physalins. When isolated from the plant, these have antibacterial and leishmanicidal activities in vitro.

It also contains caffeic acid ethyl ester, 25,27-dehydro-physalin L, physalin D, and
cuneataside E.

Cultural significance

In Japan, its bright and lantern-like fruiting calyces form a traditional part of the Bon Festival as offerings intended to help guide the souls of the dead. A market devoted to it – hōzuki-ichi – is held every year on 9–10 July near the ancient Buddhist temple of Sensō-ji in Asakusa.

Fossil record
Alkekengi seed fossils are known from Miocene of Siberia, Pliocene of Europe and Pleistocene of Germany. Pollen grains of Alkekengi officinarum have been found in early Pleistocene sediments in Ludham east of Wroxham, East Anglia.

Taxonomic history
Alkekengi officinarum was previously included in the genus Physalis until molecular and genetic evidence placed it as the type species of a new genus.

References

External links

Garden plants
Medicinal plants
Flora of Europe
Flora of Asia
Plants described in 1753
Poisonous plants
Physaleae
Monotypic Solanaceae genera